eSTREAM is a project to "identify new stream ciphers suitable for widespread adoption", organised by the EU ECRYPT network. It was set up as a result of the failure of all six stream ciphers submitted to the NESSIE project.  The call for primitives was first issued in November 2004. The project was completed in April 2008. The project was divided into separate phases and the project goal was to find algorithms suitable for different application profiles.

Profiles
The submissions to eSTREAM fall into either or both of two profiles:

 Profile 1: "Stream ciphers for software applications with high throughput requirements"
 Profile 2: "Stream ciphers for hardware applications with restricted resources such as limited storage, gate count, or power consumption."

Both profiles contain an "A" subcategory (1A and 2A) with ciphers that also provide authentication in addition to encryption. In Phase 3 none of the ciphers providing authentication are being considered (The NLS cipher had authentication removed from it to improve its performance).

eSTREAM portfolio
 the following ciphers make up the eSTREAM portfolio:

These are all free for any use. Rabbit was the only one that had a patent pending during the eStream competition, but it was released into the public domain in October 2008.

The original portfolio, published at the end of Phase 3, consisted of the above ciphers plus F-FCSR which was in Profile 2.  However, cryptanalysis of F-FCSR  led to a revision of the portfolio in September 2008 which removed that cipher.

Phases

Phase 1
Phase 1 included a general analysis of all submissions with the purpose of selecting a subset of the submitted designs for further scrutiny. The designs were scrutinized based on criteria of security, performance (with respect to the block cipher AES—a US Government approved standard, as well as the other candidates), simplicity and flexibility, justification and supporting analysis, and clarity and completeness of the documentation. Submissions in Profile 1 were only accepted if they demonstrated software performance superior to AES-128 in counter mode.

Activities in Phase 1 included a large amount of analysis and presentations of analysis results as well as discussion. The project also developed a framework for testing the performance of the candidates. The framework was then used to benchmark the candidates on a wide variety of systems.

On 27 March 2006, the eSTREAM project officially announced the end of Phase 1.

Phase 2
On 1 August 2006, Phase 2 was officially started. For each of the profiles, a number of algorithms has been selected to be Focus Phase 2 algorithms. These are designs that eSTREAM finds of particular interest and encourages more cryptanalysis and performance evaluation on these algorithms.  Additionally a number of algorithms for each profile are accepted as Phase 2 algorithms, meaning that they are still valid as eSTREAM candidates. The Focus 2 candidates will be re-classified every six months.

Phase 3
Phase 3 started in April 2007.  Candidates for Profile 1 (software) were:

 CryptMT (version 3)
 Dragon
 HC (HC-128 and HC-256)
 LEX (LEX-128, LEX-192 and LEX-256)
 NLS (NLSv2, encryption only, not authentication)
 Rabbit
 Salsa20/12
 SOSEMANUK

Candidates for Profile 2 (hardware) were:

 DECIM (DECIM v2 and DECIM-128)
 F-FCSR (F-FCSR-H v2 and F-FCSR-16)
 Grain (Grain v1 and Grain-128)
 MICKEY (MICKEY 2.0 and MICKEY-128 2.0)
 Moustique, Pomaranch (version 3)
 Trivium

Phase 3 ended on 15 April 2008, with the announcement of the candidates that had been selected for the final eSTREAM portfolio. The selected Profile 1 algorithms were: HC-128, Rabbit, Salsa20/12, and SOSEMANUK. The selected Profile 2 algorithms were: F-FCSR-H v2, Grain v1, Mickey v2, and Trivium.

Submissions

In eSTREAM portfolio
The eSTREAM portfolio ciphers are, :

Versions of the eSTREAM portfolio ciphers that support extended key lengths:

Note that the 128-bit version of Grain v1 is no longer supported by its designers and has been replaced by Grain-128a. Grain-128a is not considered to be part of the eSTREAM portfolio.

:

No longer in eSTREAM portfolio
This cipher was in the original portfolio but was removed in revision 1, published in September 2008.

Selected as Phase 3 candidates but not for the portfolio

Selected as Phase 2 focus candidates but not as Phase 3 candidates

Selected as Phase 2 candidates but not as focus or Phase 3 candidates

Not selected as focus or Phase 2 candidates

See also
 AES process
 CAESAR Competition – Competition to design authenticated encryption schemes
 NESSIE
 CRYPTREC

References

External links
 Homepage for the project
 Discussion forum
 The eSTREAM testing framework 
 Update 1: (PDF)
 Notes on the ECRYPT Stream Cipher project by Daniel J. Bernstein

Cryptography contests
Research projects
Stream ciphers

de:Stromverschlüsselung#eSTREAM